Horses in East Asian warfare are inextricably linked with the strategic and tactical evolution of armed conflict throughout the course of East Asian military history.  A warrior on horseback or horse-drawn chariot changed the balance of power between the warring civilizations throughout the arc of East Asian military history.

When warring East Asian civilizations were at odds, as the civilization with horses clashed with those without, horses provided a huge advantage to overcome, prevail, and subdue their adversaries. When both contending sides had horses, the decisive outcomes from battles hinged on the strength and strategy of their mounted horsemen. Throughout the arc of East Asian military history, strategies, and tactics were refined in terms of the use of horses.

As in most cultures around the globe, a war horse in East Asia was trained to be controlled with limited use of reins, responding primarily to the rider's legs and weight. Horses were significant factors in the Han-Hun Wars and Wuhu incursions against past kingdoms of China, and the Mongol conquest of much of Eurasia and into Europe; and they played a part in military conflicts on a smaller, more localized scale.

Horse warfare in national contexts

China

There were horse-driven chariots of the Shang (c. 1600 – c. 1050 BC) and Zhou (c. 1050 – 256 BC) periods, but horseback riding in China, according to David Andrew Graff, was not seen in warfare prior to the 4th century BC.

King Wuling of Zhao (340 BCE-295 BCE), after realizing the advantages of light cavalry warfare over that of the heavy and cumbersome chariots, instituted reforms generally known as "胡服骑射" (wearing of the Hu-nomadic people's attire, and shooting arrows from horseback), which greatly increased the combat-effectiveness of the army of Zhao.

Although mounted archers represented an initial tactical advantage over Chinese armies, the Chinese learned to adapt.  Conservative forces opposed change, which affected the proportional balance amongst cavalrymen, horse-drawn chariots and infantrymen in Chinese armies.

The benefits of using horses as light cavalry against chariots in warfare was understood when the Chinese confronted incursions from nomadic tribes of the steppes.

Feeding horses was a significant problem; and many people were driven from their land so that the Imperial horses would have adequate pastures.  Climate and fodder south of the Yangtze River were unfit for horses raised on the grasslands of the western steppes.  The Chinese army lacked a sufficient number of good quality horses. Importation was the only remedy but the only potential suppliers were the steppe-nomads. The strategic factor considered most essential in warfare was controlled exclusively by the merchant-traders of the most likely enemies.

The Chinese used chariots for horse-based warfare until light cavalry forces became common during the Warring States era (402–221 BC); and speedy cavalry accounted in part for the success of the Qin dynasty (221 BCE–206 BCE).

The Chinese warhorses were cultivated from the vast herds roaming free on the grassy plains of northeastern China and the Mongolian plateau. The hardy Central Asian horses were generally short-legged with barrel chests.  Speed was not anticipated from this configuration, but strength and endurance are characteristic features.

During the Han dynasty (206 BC–220 AD), records tell of a Chinese expedition to Fergana (in present-day Uzbekistan) and the superior horses which were acquired.  The horses were acquired for military use and for breeding.
"Horses are the foundation of military power, the great resources of the state but, should this falter, the state will fall"
 – Ma Yuan (14BC – 49AD), a Han dynasty military general and horse expert.

During the Jin dynasty (265–420), records of thousands of "armored horses" illustrate the development of warfare in this period.

Horses and skilled horsemen were often in short supply in agrarian China, and cavalry were a distinct minority in most Sui dynasty (581–618) and Tang dynasty (618–907) armies. The Imperial herds numbered 325,700 horses in 794

Throughout the Song (960–1279) all the way to the Ming dynasty (1368–1644), Chinese armies relied on an officially supervised tea-for-horse trading systems which evolved over centuries.

Tea and horses were so inextricably related that officials repeatedly requested that the tea laws and the horse administration be supervised by the same man. From the perspective of the Chinese court, government control of tea was the first step in the creation of a rational and effective policy aimed at improving the quality of horses in the army."

During the late Ming dynasty, the marked inferiority of the Chinese horses was noted by the Italian Jesuit missionary and ambassador Matteo Ricci (1552–1610), who observed:
"[The Chinese] have countless horses in the service of the army, but these are so degenerate and lacking in martial spirit that they are put to rout even by the neighing of the Tartars steed and so they are practically useless in battle."

Japan
Most Japanese horses are descended from Chinese and Korean imports, and there was some cross-breeding with indigenous horses which had existed in Japan since the Stone Age. Although records of horses in Japan are found as far back as the Jōmon period, they played little or no role in early Japanese agriculture or military conflicts until horses from the continent were introduced in the 4th century. The Kojiki and Nihon Shoki mention horses in battle.

Amongst the Imperial aristocracy, some were especially renowned for their horsemanship. It was cavalry, not infantry, which proved to be decisive in the Jinshin War of 672–673, in Fujiwara no Hirotsugu's rebellion in 740 and in the revolt of Fujiwara no Nakamaro in 756.<ref>Friday, Karl F. (1996). {{Google books|iNc89Xvh-D0C|Hired Swords: The Rise of Private Warrior Power in Early Japan, p. 37|page=37}}</ref>

Samurai fought as cavalry for many centuries, and horses were used both as draft animals and for war.  The increasingly elaborate decorations on harnesses and saddles of the samurai suggests the value accorded to these war horses.

The samurai were particularly skilled in the art of using archery from horseback. They used methods of training such as yabusame, Japanese horse archers which originated in 530 AD and reached its peak under Minamoto no Yoritomo (1147–1199 AD) in the Kamakura period. The conventions of warfare in Japan switched from an emphasis on mounted bowmen to mounted spearmen during the Sengoku period (1467–1615).

Amongst the samurai, Tokugawa Ieyasu (1543–1616) was known as an excellent horseman, which forms the foundation of an anecdote about the shōgun's character.  One day he and his troops had to cross a very narrow bridge over a raging river. All were wondering how he would ride over this dangerous bridge.  Ieyasu dismounted, led the horse over the bridge to the other side, and then he re-mounted his steed.  At Nikkō, the burial place of the horse ridden by Ieyasu Tokugawa in the Battle of Sekigahara is marked with an inscribed stone.

In pre-Meiji Japan, horses were only considered in a context of warfare and transportation of cargo. As a general rule non-samurai and women did not ride in a saddle as this was reserved for samurai warriors, however, Tomoe Gozen was an exception to the general rule  The appearance of women and non-samurai on horseback in Meiji period prints represented an innovative development.

Since 1958, a statue of a horse at Yasukuni Shrine has acknowledged the equine contributions in Japanese military actions;  and opened, full bottles of water are often left at the statues.  Other public memorials in other locations in Japan commemorate horses in Japanese warfare, e.g., the Nogi Shrine in Kyoto.

Korea

The Korean horse is the smallest of the East Asian breeds, but the breed is very strong with noteworthy stamina in terms of its size.

The earliest horse warfare of Korea was recorded during the ancient Korean kingdom Gojoseon. The influence of northern nomadic peoples and Yemaek peoples on Korean warfare dates from the 3rd century BC. By roughly the 1st century BC, the ancient kingdom of Buyeo also had mounted warriors. The cavalry of Goguryeo, one of the Three Kingdoms of Korea, were called Gaemamusa (개마무사, 鎧馬武士). King Gwanggaeto the Great often led expeditions into Baekje, Gaya confederacy, Buyeo and against Japanese pirates with his cavalry.

In the 12th century, Jurchen tribes began to violate the Goryeo-Jurchen borders, and eventually invaded Goryeo. After experiencing the invasion by the Jurchen, Korean general Yun Gwan realized that Goryeo lacked efficient cavalry units. He reorganized the Goryeo military into a professional army that would contain decent and well-trained cavalry units. In 1107, the Jurchen were ultimately defeated, and surrendered to Yun Gwan. To mark the victory, General Yun built nine fortresses to the northeast of the Goryeo-Jurchen borders (동북 9성, 東北 九城).

Inner Asia

Successive Chinese empires had at various points in history engaged their nomadic neighbors in combat with reduced effectiveness in cavalry combat, and have a various times instituted reforms to meet a highly-mobile adversary that fought principally on horseback; one such important reform as clearly recorded in Chinese historical text was King Wuling of Zhao (340BC-395BC), who advocated the principle of 胡服骑射, the "wearing of Hu nomadic people's clothing, and the firing of arrows from horseback" during the Spring and Autumn period, which greatly helped increase combat effectiveness against the cavalries of the nomadic combatants.

Nomadic opponents at the borders of the various successive Chinese empires generally used the horse effectively in warfare, which only slowly developed into changes in the way horses were used.  The Chinese historian, poet, and politician Song Qi (宋祁, 998–1061) explained,
"The reason why our enemies to the north and west are able to withstand China is precisely because they have many horses and their men are adept at riding; this is their strength.  China has few horses, and its men are not accustomed to riding; this is China's weakness....  The court constantly tries, with our weakness, to oppose our enemies' strength, so that we lose every battle .... Those who propose remedies for this situation merely wish to increase our armed forces in order to overwhelm the enemy. They do not realize that, without horses, we can never create an effective military force."

Mongolia
The warhorses of the Mongols were called cerigyn nojan.  The wars of Genghis Khan were mounted campaigns; and Mongol horses were better cared for than the horses of their enemies.  These horses were well-protected and equipped, including lamellar armour with five parts to safeguard specific parts of the horse.

By 1225, Genghis Khan's empire stretched from the Caspian Sea and northern China; and his horses grew to be highly prized throughout Continental Asia as Mongolian horses were known for their sturdiness, endurance, longevity, and stamina.  Descendants of Genghis Khan's horses remain in great number in Mongolia.

The limited pasture lands in Eastern Europe affected the westward movement of Mongolian mounted forces during the Mongolian invasions of Eastern Europe.

During World War II, many Mongolian horses were sent to the Soviet Union.

Horses in logistical support
Traditionally, the East Asian horse has been used as a pack animal, essential in providing logistical support for military forces.

Gallery

See also
 Batak Pony
 Chinese Guoxia
 Eurasian nomads
 Ferghana horse
 History of the horse in South Asia
 Horses in warfare
 Mongol, 2007 Academy Award nominee
 War of the Heavenly Horses

 Notes 

 References 
 Creel, Herlee Glessner. (1982). "The Role of the Horse in Chinese History,"  What is Taoism?, and other studies in Chinese cultural history. Chicago : University of Chicago Press. ; OCLC 221400450
 Ebrey, Patricia B., Anne Walthall and James B. Palais. (2005).  Pre-Modern East Asia to 1800: A Cultural, Social, and Political History. Boston: Houghton Mifflin Company. ; OCLC 61367794
 Ellis, John. (2004).  Cavalry: The History of Mounted Warfare.  New York:Putnam. ; OCLC 4359157
 Forbes, Andrew; Henley, David (2011). 'The Heavenly Horses of the West' in: China's Ancient Tea Horse Road. Chiang Mai: Cognoscenti Books. ASIN: B005DQV7Q2
 Gilbey, Walter. (1900).  Small Horses in Warfare. London: Vinton. OCLC 1327766
 Goodrich, L. Carrington. (2007).  A Short History of the Chinese People. Alcester, Warwickshire: Readcountrybooks.com. 
 Graff, David Andrew. (2002)   Medieval Chinese Warfare. London: Routledge. 
 Kitagawa, Hiroshi and Bruce T. Tsuchida. (1975). The Tale of the Heike. Tokyo: University of Tokyo Press. ; OCLC 164803926
 McCullough, Helen Craig. (1988).  The Tale of the Heike. Stanford: Stanford University Press. ; OCLC 16472263
 Nussbaum, Louis-Frédéric and Käthe Roth. (2005).  Japan encyclopedia. Cambridge: Harvard University Press. ; OCLC 58053128
 Nicolle, David. (2000).  Medieval Warfare Source Book: Warfare In Western Christendom. 	London : Arms and Armour. ; OCLC 34203769
 Titsingh, Isaac. (1834).  Annales des empereurs du Japon (Nihon Odai Ichiran'').  Paris: Royal Asiatic Society, Oriental Translation Fund of Great Britain and Ireland. OCLC 5850691 
 Turnbull, Stephen.  (2002).  War in Japan: 1467–1615. Oxford: Osprey Publishing. 

Cavalry
Horse history and evolution
Military animals
Military history of China
Military history of East Asia
Military history of Japan
Military history of Korea
Military history of the Mongol Empire
Warhorses
Working horses